The 1910–11 FA Cup was the 40th season of the world's oldest association football competition, the Football Association Challenge Cup (more usually known as the FA Cup). Bradford City won the competition for the first and (as of 2021) only time, beating holders Newcastle United 1–0 in the replay of the final at Old Trafford in Manchester, through a goal from Jimmy Speirs. The first match, held at Crystal Palace, London, was a 0–0 draw.

Matches were scheduled to be played at the stadium of the team named first on the date specified for each round, which was always a Saturday. If scores were level after 90 minutes had been played, a replay would take place at the stadium of the second-named team later the same week. If the replayed match was drawn further replays would be held at neutral venues until a winner was determined. If scores were level after 90 minutes had been played in a replay, a 30-minute period of extra time would be played.

1911 was the first year that the current trophy design was used. The FA commissioned Fattorini's of Bradford to design and manufacture a new, larger trophy. Coincidentally, it was won by Bradford City in its first outing. This trophy still exists but is now too fragile to be used, so an exact replica was made by Toye, Kenning and Spencer and has been in use since the 1992 final. The replica of the original, last used in 1910, was presented to the FA's long-serving president Lord Kinnaird. It was sold at Christie's in 2005 to David Gold. Gold has loaned this trophy to the National Football Museum in Manchester where it is on permanent display.

Calendar
The format of the FA Cup for the season had two preliminary rounds, five qualifying rounds, four proper rounds, and the semi finals and final.

First round proper
36 of the 40 clubs from the First and Second divisions joined the 12 clubs who came through the qualifying rounds. Four sides, Stockport County, Lincoln City, Huddersfield Town and Gainsborough Trinity were entered instead at the Fourth Qualifying Round. Huddersfield lost to Lincoln City in that round, Stockport County lost to Rochdale, while Lincoln City themselves lost to Stoke in the fifth qualifying round. Gainsborough and eleven other non-league clubs won through to the first round proper.

Sixteen non-league sides were given byes to the first round to bring the total number of teams up to 64. These were:

32 matches were scheduled to be played on Saturday, 14 January 1911. Four matches were drawn and went to replays in the following midweek fixture.

Second round proper
The sixteen second-round matches were played on Saturday, 4 February 1911. Four matches were drawn, with the replays taking place in the following midweek fixture.

Third round proper
The eight third-round matches were scheduled for Saturday, 25 February 1911. There were no replays.

Fourth round proper
The four fourth-round matches were scheduled for Saturday, 11 March 1911. There were no replays.

Semi-finals

The semi-final matches were played on Saturday, 25 March 1911. Both matches were 3–0 wins, to Newcastle United and Bradford City won, going on to meet each other in the final.

Final

The Final was the 40th FA Cup final. It was contested by Bradford City and Newcastle United. The first game resulted in a goalless draw at Crystal Palace. A single goal scored by Jimmy Speirs for Bradford won the replay at Old Trafford.

Match details

Replay

See also
FA Cup Final Results 1872-

References
General
Official site; fixtures and results service at TheFA.com
1910-11 FA Cup at rsssf.com
1910-11 FA Cup at soccerbase.com

Specific

1910-11
FA
Cup